Pinckneyville Community High School is a public high school in Pinckneyville, Illinois. It is located in Perry County Illinois.

Academics
PCHS requires students to obtain a minimum of 32 credit hours in order to graduate. The core requirements include 4 credits in English, 3 credits in Math, 3 credits in Social Sciences, 3 credits in Science, 2 credits in Fine Arts, 2 credits in Physical Education, 1 credit in Vocational Education, and to satisfy the Consumer Education requirement

Extracurricular activities

Athletics

The school participates in the Illinois High School Association (IHSA), and is a member of the Southern Illinois River-to-River Conference. Students compete in football, golf, cross-country, cheerleading, basketball, wrestling, baseball, track, volleyball, and softball.

Pinckneyville is known for its boys basketball program, winning over 1,500 games and appearing in the State Finals Tournament 11 times (winning in 1948, 1994 and 2001).

Clubs and activities

Clubs and activities that students of PCHS are given the option of joining include Art Club, Beta Club, Chorus, Concert Band, FFA, FCCLA, Green Team, Jazz Band, Marching Panthers, Music Makers of America, Panther Bakers, Pep Band, Poms, Pyramid Staff, Science Club, Scholar Bowl, Spanish Club, Student Council, and FBLA.

Some of the activities put on by the various clubs include the numerous concerts held by Chorus, Concert Band, and Jazz Band, FFA Week by the FFA Chapter, the annual musical by the Music Makers, Homecoming Week by the Student Council, and Snowcoming Week by FBLA.

Demographics
PCHS has a population of 54% male students to 46% female students. Current ethnicity includes 98% white, 1% black, and 1% other.

Sources

http://www.pchspanthers.com
http://www.publicschoolreview.com/school_ov/school_id/26315
http://www.localschooldirectory.com/public-school/27640/IL
http://www.schoolmatters.com/schools.aspx/q/page=sp/sid=64863

External links
 School Website

Public high schools in Illinois
Schools in Perry County, Illinois